Sir Christopher Wren was 33 years old and near the beginning of his career as an architect when the Great Fire of London in 1666 destroyed many of the city's public buildings, including 88 of its parish churches. Wren's office was commissioned to build 51 replacement churches and St Paul's Cathedral. Many of these buildings survive to this day; others have been substantially altered or rebuilt. Some others were completely or partially destroyed during the German Blitz of 1940–41; yet others were demolished for different reasons.

Churches in the City of London
Many of Wren's churches were demolished as the population of the City of London declined in the 19th century and more were destroyed or damaged during the Blitz.

Survived in original form

Substantially altered before the Blitz

Substantially rebuilt after the Blitz
The Blitz in 1940–1941 damaged nearly all the churches in the City of London and many were nearly destroyed leaving just the outer walls and tower. However most of them were rebuilt to Wren's original design.

Tower remaining
These churches were destroyed in the Blitz or demolished in the 19th century. Only their towers remained with perhaps a short section of the outer wall. They are no longer working churches.

Stones re-used

Demolished due to the Union of Benefices Act (chronological order)
The population of the City of London declined sharply in the 19th century, and the Union of Benefices Act 1860 reduced the number of parish churches. The surplus churches were demolished.

Demolished for other reasons (chronological order)

Destroyed in the Blitz
These churches were destroyed in the Blitz and their ruins demolished afterwards.

Interior refurbished by Christopher Wren

Churches built outside the City of London
These churches were outside the area of the Great Fire of London.

See also
 List of demolished churches in the City of London

Bibliography

 Godwin, George (1839), Churches of London, Vols.1–2, C. Tilt

External links

Friends of the City Churches
Church Bells of the City of London
City of London Churches by Mark McManus
Churches in the City from the Diocese of London
Where the existing Wren churches are in London from Google maps
View interiors of Wren Churches in 360 degrees

Wren churches
Wren churches
Wren churches

Lists of buildings and structures by architect
London religion-related lists